Sibelius may refer to:
 Jean Sibelius (1865–1957), Finnish composer of classical music, or his namesakes:
Sibelius Academy, a music university in Finland
 Sibelius (film), a 2003 film about the composer
Sibelius Hall, a concert hall
Sibelius (scorewriter), a scorewriter program developed by Sibelius Software Limited, now part of Avid
Sibelius monument, a monument to the composer
Sibelius (train), a train that operated between Helsinki and St. Petersburg on the Riihimäki–Saint Petersburg Railway
1405 Sibelius, an asteroid

See also 
Sebelius, a list of people with the surname
Sabellius, third-century theologian
National Federation of Independent Business v. Sebelius, a landmark United States Supreme Court decision over Healthcare